Axel Mohamed Bakayoko (born 6 January 1998) is a French professional footballer who plays as a winger.

Club career

Inter Milan 
Bakayoko made his UEFA Europa League debut for Inter Milan on 8 December 2016 against Sparta Prague. He replaced Andrea Pinamonti after 80 minutes.

Loan to Sochaux 
He joined French club Sochaux on 10 July 2017 for a season long loan. He made his Ligue 2 debut on 28 July as a substitute replacing Aldo Kalulu in the 65th minute of a 2–0 home win over Bourg-Péronnas. On 8 August he played in the first round of the Coupe de la Ligue in a 3–1 away defeat against Valenciennes, he was replaced by Florin Berenguer after 70 minute. On 19 September, Bakayoko played his first match as a starter in Ligue 2, a 1–0 away defeat against Le Havre, he was replaced by Thomas Robinet in the 74th minute. On 6 February 2018, Bakayoko played his first match in Coupe de France as a substitute replacing Florian Martin in the 34th minute of a 4–1 home defeat against Paris Saint-Germain. On 6 April he scored his first professional goal, as a substitute, in the 89th minute of a 3–2 home win over Orléans. Bakayoko ended his loan to Sochaux with 19 appearances, one goal and one assist, he also played four matches in the reserve team in Championnat National 3.

Loan to St. Gallen 
On 17 July 2018, Inter announced that they had loaned out Bakayoko to Swiss club FC St. Gallen for the whole 2018/19 season. Bakayoko had a good season with the Swiss side, playing 34 games for the club in that season, many of them on the right back although his normal position was on the wing. At the end of the season it was confirmed, that Bakayoko would stay one more season at the club, still on loan from Inter.

Red Star Belgrade 
On 22 December 2020, Bakayoko signed a three and a half year contract with Serbian club Red Star Belgrade.

Loan to Novi Pazar 
On 7 February 2022 Bakayoko was loaned to Serbian Superliga side Novi Pazar until the end of 2021–22 season.

Personal life
Bakayoko is born in France and is of Ivorian descent.

Honours

Club 
Inter Milan Primavera
 Coppa Italia Primavera: 2015–16
 Campionato Primavera: 2016–17

Red Star Belgrade
Serbian SuperLiga (2): 2020–21, 2021–22
Serbian Cup (2): 2020–21, 2021–22

References

External links
 
 
 

 

1998 births
Living people
Footballers from Paris
French footballers
France youth international footballers
French sportspeople of Ivorian descent
Inter Milan players
FC Sochaux-Montbéliard players
FC St. Gallen players
Red Star Belgrade footballers
FK Novi Pazar players
Serie A players
Ligue 2 players
Swiss Super League players
Association football wingers
French expatriate footballers
Expatriate footballers in Italy
Expatriate footballers in Switzerland
Expatriate footballers in Serbia
French expatriate sportspeople in Italy
French expatriate sportspeople in Serbia